Geurts is a Dutch patronymic surname. The given name Geurt may be a variant of Geert from Gerard, or a short form of Govert  or Godert (Godard).  Notable people with the surname include:

Carla Geurts (born 1971), Dutch freestyle swimmer
Darryl Geurts (born 1994), German football midfielder
Jaco Geurts (born 1970), Dutch CDA politician
James Geurts (born c.1966), American Assistant Secretary of the Navy since 2017
James Geurts (artist), whose work will feature in the Adelaide Railway Station revitalisation project
Jean-Richard Geurts (born 1957), Belgian comics artist known as "Janry"
Joop Geurts (1923–2009), Dutch baseball player
Joseph Geurts (born 1939), Belgian racing cyclist
Loes Geurts (born 1986), Dutch football goalkeeper
Mascha Geurts (born 1973), Dutch water polo goalkeeper
Rob Geurts (born 1959), Dutch bobsledder
Tom Geurts (born 1964), Dutch economist
Toon Geurts (1932-2017), Dutch sprint canoer
Willy Geurts (born 1954), Belgian football striker
Yvonne Geurts (1907–1952), Belgian figure skater

References

Dutch-language surnames
Patronymic surnames